Major H. G. Morris was an acting Commander of the Ceylon Volunteers Force in 1902.

References

Commanders of the Ceylon Defence Force
Duke of Cornwall's Light Infantry officers